Willow Valley is an unincorporated community and census-designated place (CDP) in Mohave County, Arizona, United States. The population was 1,059 as of the 2020 census.

Geography
Willow Valley is located in western Mohave County at  (34.918471, -114.610934). It is in the Mohave Valley, on the east side of the Colorado River. It is bordered to the east by the community of Mohave Valley and to the west across the Colorado by San Bernardino County, California.

Arizona State Route 95 runs along the eastern edge of the community, leading north  to Bullhead City and south  to Needles, California.

Demographics

At the 2000 census there were 585 people, 274 households, and 192 families living in the CDP. The racial makeup of the CDP was 93.16% White, 0.17% Black or African American, 1.71% Native American, 0.34% Asian, 1.88% from other races, and 2.74% from two or more races.  6.67% of the population were Hispanic or Latino of any race.
Of the 274 households 14.6% had children under the age of 18 living with them, 58.4% were married couples living together, 7.3% had a female householder with no husband present, and 29.6% were non-families. 24.1% of households were one person and 13.1% were one person aged 65 or older.  The average household size was 2.14 and the average family size was 2.48.

The age distribution was 13.7% under the age of 18, 2.4% from 18 to 24, 21.5% from 25 to 44, 29.4% from 45 to 64, and 33.0% 65 or older.  The median age was 56 years. For every 100 females, there were 101.0 males.  For every 100 females age 18 and over, there were 98.0 males.

The median household income was $39,250 and the median family income  was $41,406. Males had a median income of $25,147 versus $24,219 for females. The per capita income for the CDP was $16,956.  None of the population or families were below the poverty line.

References

Census-designated places in Mohave County, Arizona
Census-designated places in Arizona